Cashion Community (commonly called Cashion) is a city in Wichita County, Texas, United States. It was incorporated in 2000 and had a population of 348 in 2010. Cashion Community is part of the Wichita Falls, Texas metropolitan statistical area.

Geography

Cashion Community is located at  (34.036429, –98.508225), eight miles north of Wichita Falls off State Highway 240 in northeastern Wichita County. Its elevation is 994 feet above mean sea level.

History
Settlement in the area began about 1897, when Hi Willis purchased land. A one-room schoolhouse was built on donated land and named for T.J. Cashion, a county commissioner. The school became the center of the community. Oil was discovered in 1918, which led to a significant influx of residents. In the 1920s, the Cooper, Friberg, and Bacon school consolidated with Cashion and eventually the campus was expanded to accommodate a four-year high school.

Oil production declined in the 1930s and the high school closed in 1936. Its furnishings were auctioned off in 1945 and Cashion area students attended school in the larger community of Burkburnett. A Texas Historical Marker, erected in 1993, honors Cashion School.

Voting to become a city was January 15, 2000. Mayor election was May 6, 2000, with Thomas J. Lowry, Sr. serving as its first mayor. Preston Giles was the first councilman, Dorothy Bradley was the first councilwoman, and Pat Giles was the first city secretary.

Demographics

2020 census

As of the 2020 United States census, there were 286 people, 112 households, and 74 families residing in the city.

Education
Cashion Community is served by the Burkburnett Independent School District.

References

External links
 Cashion Community, TX city profile
 

Cities in Texas
Cities in Wichita County, Texas
Wichita Falls metropolitan area
2000 establishments in Texas